= Kuklin (surname) =

Kuklin or Kouklin (Russian: Куклин, from кукла meaning a doll or куколь meaning a cockle) is a Russian masculine surname, its feminine counterpart is Kuklina or Kouklina.
